Shell Beach, California may refer to:

Shell Beach, La Jolla
Shell Beach, a neighborhood of Pismo Beach, California